Eleni Kounalakis (née Tsakopoulos; born March 3, 1966) is an American politician, businesswoman, and former diplomat serving as the 50th lieutenant governor of California since 2019. A member of the Democratic Party, she is the first woman elected to the office.

Kounalakis previously served as the United States Ambassador to Hungary from 2010 to 2013. She was sworn into office on January 7, 2010, and presented her credentials to President László Sólyom on January 11, 2010. On April 24, 2017, Kounalakis announced her bid for the office of Lieutenant Governor of California in the 2018 election. She came in first place in the June 5, 2018 primary election; she was elected on November 6, 2018.

Career

Private career

Before accepting President Barack Obama's nomination to an ambassadorship, Kounalakis was President of AKT Development Corporation, one of California's largest housing development firms, which was founded by her father. Kounalakis earned her undergraduate degree from Dartmouth College and a Master of Business Administration from the University of California, Berkeley's Haas School of Business.

Kounalakis and her husband, print and broadcast journalist Markos Kounalakis, founded two university chairs in Hellenic studies, the Markos and Eleni Tsakopoulos Kounalakis chair at Georgetown University, held by the scholar of late Classical and early Hellenistic Greek literature, Dr. Alexander Sens, and the Tsakopoulos Kounalakis chair in honor of Constantine Mitsotakis at Stanford University, held by Josiah Ober. Both chairs focus on the understanding of the origins of Athenian democracy. They also established the Tsakopoulos Kounalakis lecture series at the Woodrow Wilson International Center for Scholars to focus on democracy and international relations.

Kounalakis served for nearly ten years as a Trustee of the World Council of Religions for Peace. In recognition for her work with the WCRP, she was awarded the medal of St. Paul, the Greek Orthodox Church of America’s highest honor. San Francisco Mayor Gavin Newsom appointed her to serve as a Trustee of the War Memorial and Performing Arts Center. San Francisco Mayor Ed Lee appointed her to serve on the Port Commission Board.

Political career
She served four times as a delegate to the Democratic National Convention and as an at-large member of the California State Democratic Central Committee. She also served as a member of the First 5 California Commission, and the California Blue Ribbon Commission on Autism. She served as a Trustee of Robert Redford's Sundance Preserve and on the Conservation Fund’s National Forum on Children and Nature. She is also a senior advisor at Albright Stonebridge Group.

On April 24, 2017, Kounalakis announced her bid for the office of Lieutenant Governor of California in the 2018 election. She came in first place on June 5, 2018 in the top-two statewide primary; Democratic State Senator Ed Hernandez placed second. On November 6, Kounalakis was elected by a 56.6% to 43.3% margin against her opponent. Kounalakis, along with then Governor-elect Gavin Newsom, took office on January 7, 2019.

After her candidacy announcement, she visited all 58 counties in California during her campaign. Her grassroots campaign earned the recognition of Time magazine for engaging hundreds of volunteers to text over 1 million voters before Election Day. On November 6, 2018, Kounalakis became the first female elected Lieutenant Governor of California in history; Mona Pasquil was appointed in an acting capacity in 2009 following the resignation of John Garamendi but was not elected to the post.

Personal life
Kounalakis and Markos married in 2000. They have two sons. She is the daughter of Angelo Tsakopoulos, a Sacramento developer. Kounalakis is of Greek descent and grew up a member of the Greek Orthodox Church. In 2011, she received an Honorary Doctor of Law from the American College of Greece.

Notes

References

External links 

Official website of the California Lt. Governor
Campaign website

|-

1966 births
20th-century American businesspeople
20th-century American businesswomen
21st-century American businesspeople
21st-century American businesswomen
21st-century American politicians
21st-century American women politicians
Ambassadors of the United States to Hungary
American people of Greek descent
American real estate businesspeople
American women ambassadors
Businesspeople from Sacramento, California
Democratic Party state constitutional officers of California
Dartmouth College alumni
Haas School of Business alumni
Lieutenant Governors of California
Living people
Politicians from Sacramento, California
Women in California politics